The Canon de 194 mm Modèle 1887 was a turret mounted medium-caliber naval gun used as the primary armament of a number of armored cruisers of the French Navy during World War I.

Design
The Mle 1887 guns were typical built-up guns of the period with a rifled steel liner and several layers of steel reinforcing hoops.  The guns used an interrupted screw breech and the new smokeless powder of the period.

Naval service
Ships that carried the Mle 1887 include:

  - This armored cruiser had a primary armament of two Mle 1887 guns in single turrets fore and aft.
 s - This class of four armored cruisers had a primary armament of two Mle 1887 guns in single turrets fore and aft.

Ammunition
The Mle 1893-1896 used separate-loading ammunition with two bagged charges weighing .

Notes

References
 

Naval guns of France
194 mm artillery
World War I naval weapons